La Cropte  is a commune in the Mayenne department in north-western France.

Geography
The Vaige forms most of the commune's north-western border, then flows southeastwards through the middle of the commune.

See also
Communes of the Mayenne department

References

Cropte